Renwick is a small town in Marlborough, New Zealand, close to the south bank of the Wairau River. State Highway 63 runs southwest from Renwick through the Wairau River valley.

The town was initially known as "Upper Wairau", and then as "Renwicktown" after an early landowner, Dr. Thomas Renwick.

Renwick is located in the centre of Marlborough's grape growing region. Sauvignon blanc is the variety usually associated with the area, and famous wineries such as Isabel Estate and Forrest Estate are in close proximity. Pinot Gris (Grey Pinot) is also exported.

Demographics

Renwick had a population of 2,418 at the 2018 New Zealand census, an increase of 165 people (7.3%) since the 2013 census, and an increase of 456 people (23.2%) since the 2006 census. There were 909 households. There were 1,218 males and 1,200 females, giving a sex ratio of 1.01 males per female. The median age was 39.6 years (compared with 37.4 years nationally), with 546 people (22.6%) aged under 15 years, 351 (14.5%) aged 15 to 29, 1,131 (46.8%) aged 30 to 64, and 390 (16.1%) aged 65 or older.

Ethnicities were 93.1% European/Pākehā, 11.0% Māori, 1.4% Pacific peoples, 2.0% Asian, and 2.6% other ethnicities (totals add to more than 100% since people could identify with multiple ethnicities).

The proportion of people born overseas was 14.9%, compared with 27.1% nationally.

Although some people objected to giving their religion, 60.8% had no religion, 28.5% were Christian, 0.5% were Buddhist and 2.1% had other religions.

Of those at least 15 years old, 270 (14.4%) people had a bachelor or higher degree, and 408 (21.8%) people had no formal qualifications. The median income was $37,000, compared with $31,800 nationally. The employment status of those at least 15 was that 1,038 (55.4%) people were employed full-time, 309 (16.5%) were part-time, and 42 (2.2%) were unemployed.

Education
Renwick School is a coeducational full primary school (years 1–8), with a decile rating of 8  with a role of 

The first school in Renwick opened at the beginning of 1861, using the Presbyterian Church as a schoolroom. It was the second school in Marlborough. The present school opened in 1864.

Notes

External links

 Renwick School website
 Giesen Sports and Events Centre

Populated places in the Marlborough Region